Mario Gyr (born 2 May 1985) is a Swiss rower. He won gold at the 2016 Summer Olympics in the men's lightweight four with Lucas Tramèr, Simon Schürch and Simon Niepmann. The same team, coached by New Zealander Ian Wright, also won this event in the 2015 World Championships. He also competed in the men's lightweight coxless four event at the 2012 Summer Olympics, finishing fifth.

References

External links
 

1985 births
Living people
Swiss male rowers
Rowers at the 2012 Summer Olympics
Rowers at the 2016 Summer Olympics
Olympic rowers of Switzerland
Medalists at the 2016 Summer Olympics
Olympic medalists in rowing
Olympic gold medalists for Switzerland
World Rowing Championships medalists for Switzerland
Sportspeople from Lucerne
21st-century Swiss people